Don Pietro de' Medici (3 June 1554 – 25 April 1604) was the youngest son of Cosimo I de' Medici, Grand Duke of Tuscany and Eleonora di Toledo.

Early in 1571 he went to Rome and in the spring of 1575 he went to Venice. In 1571 he married his first cousin Eleonora di Garzia di Toledo, whom he accused of adultery and strangled with a dog leash in July 1576 at the Villa Medici at Cafaggiolo. He also had her supposed lover Bernardino Antinori imprisoned and killed.

At the end of 1577, he went for the first of many stays at the Spanish court. He remained in Spain until the end of 1578. During this visit he gained a reputation as a spendthrift and a rake. He left Tuscany in October 1579 to bring Italian troops to Spain and lead them during the mission to Portugal. He stayed in Lisbon until the end of 1582 when he returned to Spain where his presence is documented in 1583 and 1584.

His correspondence proves that he had serious money problems. He came to Italy in July 1584 to ask his brothers to cover his debts, incurring their disapproval for living with a woman with a questionable reputation. The Medici court tried to arrange a marriage for Pietro. In July 1586 he went back to Spain, where he continued to accumulate debts. He came back to Italy in November 1587 after Francesco I de' Medici's death and stayed until September 1589, when he went back to Spain.

His marriage to Dona Beatriz de Lara, daughter of Manuel de Menezes, the Portuguese Duke of Vila Real, in 1593 did little to stabilize him economically and emotionally. Pietro continued to see his lover Antonia de Carvajal who gave him five children out of wedlock. He also had an illegitimate son with Maria della Ribera.

He kept writing to his brother Ferdinando I de' Medici, asking for a portion of the family fortune to cover his debts. In 1596 he came to Italy to appeal in vain to the Pope to side with him in the controversy. Pietro died, deeply in debt, before turning 50. After his death his illegitimate children were all brought to Florence to be cared for by the Medici. Pietro was buried in the Monasterio de la Santissima Trinidad in Madrid. His corpse was later brought to Florence by Cosimo II de' Medici.

References

Ancestry

1554 births
1604 deaths
Pietro de' Medici, Don
16th-century Italian nobility
17th-century Italian nobility
Pietro de' Medici
Burials at San Lorenzo, Florence
Sons of monarchs